The Fryer House is located in Butler, Kentucky. This historic two-story stone house was built by Pendleton County, Kentucky pioneer Walter Fryer in 1811.  Abraham Vastine, a housebuilder, built this house of limestone from an adjacent quarry, and it has walls two feet thick. The roof truss system is built of wood framing held together with wooden pegs. The home was not completed until 1813.

It is a two-story three-bay stone hall and parlor plan house, with one-story frame additions on the east and north.  The home was listed on the National Register of Historic Places in 1976.

The Pendleton County Historical Society announced in April 2007 that it had leased the home for 99 years as a museum and Society offices. The building had been vacant for seven years.

References

External links
The Fryer Home
Pendleton County Historical Society
Pendleton County National Register of Historic Places

Houses on the National Register of Historic Places in Kentucky
Houses in Pendleton County, Kentucky
Houses completed in 1813
National Register of Historic Places in Pendleton County, Kentucky
1813 establishments in Kentucky
Stone houses in Kentucky
Hall and parlor houses